Mohammad Soleiman Alizadeh (born 27 September 1991) is an Iranian footballer who plays as a midfielder.

Club career
Alizadeh started his career as a youth player at Rah Ahan. He was promoted to the first team in the summer of 2012 by head coach Ali Daei.

Career statistics

References

1991 births
Living people
Iranian footballers
Sportspeople from Mazandaran province
Association football midfielders
Rah Ahan players
Sanat Mes Kerman F.C. players
Khooneh be Khooneh players
Sepidrood Rasht players
Persian Gulf Pro League players
Azadegan League players
Iran youth international footballers